Helsingor or variation may refer to:

Places
 Helsingør, Helsingør Municipality, Denmark; aka "Elsinore"; a city
 Helsingør Municipality, Denmark; aka "Elsinore Municipality"; an administrative region containing the city of Helsingor
 Diocese of Helsingør, Denmark; of the Evangelical Lutheran Church of Denmark.

Facilities
 Helsingør Station, Helsingør, Helsingør Municipality, Denmark; a rail station
 Helsingør Stadium, Helsingør, Helsingør Municipality, Denmark; a soccer stadium
 Helsingør Gymnasium, Helsingør, Helsingør Municipality, Denmark; aka "Elsinore High School"
 Helsingør Cemetery, Helsingør, Helsingør Municipality, Denmark; 
 Helsingør City Museum
 Helsingør Maritime Museum

Other uses
 Convention of Helsingör, a 17th-century treaty between the Dutch Republic and Swedish Empire
 FC Helsingør, a soccer team in Elsinore

See also
 Elsinore (disambiguation)